The Singapore Indoor Stadium, known exonymously as the Indoor Stadium, is an indoor arena located in Kallang, Singapore. It is within walking distance of the Singapore National Stadium, and collectively form a part of the wider Singapore Sports Hub. It has a maximum total capacity of 15,000 depending on configuration, with an all-seating configuration of 12,000.

It regularly hosts events such as music concerts, badminton, basketball, netball, tennis, esports, pro-wrestling, mixed martial arts, kickboxing, and monster truck races. The Singaporean ONE Championship regularly hosts its events here. In 2015, the Singapore Indoor Stadium sold 72,342 tickets for the entire year. In 2022, the stadium was the venue for The International 2022, the annual Dota 2 world championship esports tournament and the largest single-tournament prize pool of any esport event.

Both the Stadium MRT station on the Circle line and the Tanjong Rhu MRT station on the Thomson–East Coast line enables visitors to commute to the stadium via train service. Kallang MRT station on the East West line is also within reasonable distance, with a direct connection via sheltered walkways.

History
Construction began on 1 January 1985, and it was built at a cost of S$90 million. The arena was designed by Japanese architect Kenzo Tange, and it has a cone shaped roof and a pillarless arena. It was completed on 1 March 1987 and officially opened to public on 1 July 1988.

On 31 December 1989, Singapore Indoor Stadium was officially opened in an inaugural ceremony by the Prime Minister of Singapore, Lee Kuan Yew.

Capacity
Due to its flexible stage configuration, the capacity of the stadium varies from 7,306 to 7,968 during concerts to 8,126–10,786 during sporting events. Its full seating capacity is around 12,000, and its full capacity is 15,000.

Sporting events

Entertainment events
The stadium has hosted major concerts and shows by many famous artists and bands, spanning many different genres.

1990–2010

2011–2020

2021–present

Other events
The evangelical Alpha Conference organised by the megachurch Hope Church Singapore was held at the Singapore Indoor Stadium on 28–29 May 2016.

Incidents
In 2013, a service engineer who was trying to service an audio visual projection system died after falling down approximately 9 meters of height. Investigations revealed that the engineer had not properly equipped himself with a safety harness prior to the procedure.

See also
 Sport in Singapore
 Singapore Sports Hub
 Sport Singapore
 Kallang MRT station
 Stadium MRT station
 Tanjong Rhu MRT station

References

External links

 Singapore Indoor Stadium official website

ASEAN Basketball League venues
Indoor arenas in Singapore
Badminton venues
Sports venues completed in 1989
Basketball venues in Singapore
Defunct National Basketball League (Australia) venues
Kallang
Venues of the 2010 Summer Youth Olympics
1989 establishments in Singapore
International Premier Tennis League
Tennis venues in Singapore
Netball venues in Singapore
20th-century architecture in Singapore